Reinhard Alber (born 6 February 1964) is a German former cyclist. He won the bronze medal in the team pursuit along with  Rolf Gölz, Roland Günther and Michael Marx in the 1984 Summer Olympics.

References

1964 births
Living people
German male cyclists
Cyclists at the 1984 Summer Olympics
Olympic cyclists of West Germany
Olympic bronze medalists for West Germany
People from Singen
Sportspeople from Freiburg (region)
Cyclists from Baden-Württemberg
Medalists at the 1984 Summer Olympics
Olympic medalists in cycling